Mandhoo (Dhivehi: މަންދޫ) is one of the inhabited islands of Alif Dhaal Atoll.

Geography

Demography

References

Islands of the Maldives